Suku may refer to:

Language
Suku language, a Bantu language of the Democratic Republic of the Congo.

Society
Suku, the clan system of Minangkabau people
Suku people, an ethnic group of Central Africa

Given names
Suku Park, South Korean artist